The Minister of Home Affairs was a member of the Executive Committee of the Privy Council of Northern Ireland (Cabinet) in the Parliament of Northern Ireland which governed Northern Ireland from 1921 to 1972. The Minister of Home Affairs was responsible for a range of non-economic domestic matters, although for a few months in 1953 the office was combined with that of the Minister of Finance.

Under the Civil Authorities (Special Powers) Act (Northern Ireland) 1922, the Minister was enabled to make any regulation necessary to preserve or re-establish law and order in Northern Ireland. The act specifically entitled him to ban parades, meetings, and publications, and to forbid inquests.

One of the position's more problematic duties was responsibility for parades in Northern Ireland under the Special Powers Act and from 1951 the Public Order Act. Parading was (and is) extremely contentious in Northern Ireland, and so the Minister was bound to anger one community or other regardless of what decision he made. Ministers generally allowed parades by the Orange Order and other Protestant groups to go where they wanted, while restricting nationalist parades to Catholic areas and banning republican or anti-partitionist parades. Communist and other far-left parades were also sometimes banned. From time to time Ministers, for example Brian Maginess, attempted to administer the parading issue more fairly, but usually suffered career damage as a result. The parading issue may be the reason why the Home Affairs portfolio changed hands more often than most other Ministerial positions.

In 1970, the office was combined with that of Prime Minister of Northern Ireland with John Taylor serving as a cabinet rank junior minister, and then abolished along with the rest of the Northern Irish government in 1973.

Ministers of State
1970–1972 John Taylor

Senior Parliamentary Secretaries
1971–1972 Albert Anderson

Parliamentary Secretary to the Ministry of Home Affairs
1921 – 1925 Robert Dick Megaw
1925 – 1937 George Boyle Hanna
1937 – 1938 John Clarke Davison
1938 – 1940 Edmond Warnock
1940 – 1943 William Lowry
1943 – 1944 Wilson Hungerford
1944 – 1955 vacant
1955 – 1956 Terence O'Neill
1956 – 1963 vacant
1963 – 1964 William Kennedy Fitzsimmons
1964 – 1969 vacant
1969 Robert Porter
1969 – 1970 John Taylor
1970 office abolished

References

Executive Committee of the Privy Council of Northern Ireland
Law of Northern Ireland
1921 establishments in Northern Ireland
1972 disestablishments in Northern Ireland